Ihor Viktorovych Kolykhaiev (born on 8 May 1971) is a Ukrainian politician who has served as mayor of Kherson since the 2020 Ukrainian local elections. Kolykhaiev is former People's Deputy of Ukraine, elected in the 2019 Ukrainian parliamentary election.

Since 28 June 2022, his whereabouts are unknown after being abducted by Russian agents amidst the 2022 Russian invasion of Ukraine and the occupation of Kherson.

Personal life
Ihor Kolykhaiev was born on 8 May 1971, in Kherson. His mother worked as a shop assistant, and his father as a lathe operator at the enterprise. After school graduation, he entered A. Popov Navy Institute of Radio-electronics in Saint Petersburg. Having got higher education, Kolykhaiev returned to his native city and in 1995 started to work as an entrepreneur. Kolykhaiev has two children.

In 2016, Kolykhaiev founded Ihor Kolykhaev's Charity Fund which is aimed at charity help to sportsmen and Kherson citizens.

In 2006, Yurii Bokalo established the futsal club, MFC Prodexim Kherson, named after Ihor Kolykhaev's enterprise ”Prodexim.”

Political career
In October 2015, Ihor Kolykhaiev stood for becoming a deputy at Kherson Oblast Council in accordance with the lists of political party Petro Poroshenko Bloc. Having received 25.2% votes at the electoral ward, he was elected in the 2015 Ukrainian local elections a deputy of Kherson Oblast Council of the 7th convocation and in December 2015, he took the oath. 
On 21 July 2019, he was elected in the 2019 Ukrainian parliamentary election the people's deputy of Ukraine of the 9th convocation at 184 first past the post election constituency. 
At the Verkhovna Rada (Ukraine's national parliament) of the 9th convocation 
Faction a Deputy Group member "For the Future". 
He became the Head's deputy Committee of the Verkhovna Rada of Ukraine on agricultural matters and soil policy
at the Verkhovna Rada of the 9th convocation. 

Kolykhaiev was elected mayor of Kherson in the 2020 Ukrainian local elections. A party founded by him called "" won 13 of the 54 seats in the Kherson City Council in the same election.

On 30 March 2021, Kolykhaiev resigned from the Verkhovna Rada to focus on his role as mayor.

On 24 February 2022, the start of the 2022 Russian invasion of Ukraine, Russian forces advancing from Crimea began the Battle of Kherson. The battle destroyed parts of the city, with Kolykhaiev even having to allow volunteers to dig mass graves. On March 2, the battle ended in a Russian victory, making it the first major Ukrainian city to fall. Kolykhaiev reported 10 Russian officers including their commander, came into the city's administration. After some discussion, they came to an agreement on rules the city would have to follow while under Russian occupation. Kolykhaiev pushed for his own demands of the Russian officers during the meeting, which included the Ukrainian flag flying over the administration building, tanks not being allowed into the city, and humanitarian aid / evacuations. He later told The New York Times that the Russian officers had informed him of their plans to set up a military administration. He expressed distaste for the situation. The occupational administration installed a puppet government of Kherson, replacing him with Oleksandr Kobets, on 27 April 2022. On 28 June, Kolykhaiev was abducted by Russian agents. His whereabouts are unknown 

On 21 September 2022, President of Ukraine Volodymyr Zelenskyy appointed Halyna Luhova as Head of the Kherson City Military Administration. Luhova performs the functions of mayor.

Awards 
Medal of Merit of Ukraine's Football Federation.

References

External links
 

1971 births
Living people
Politicians from Kherson
Ninth convocation members of the Verkhovna Rada
Mayors of Kherson
21st-century Ukrainian politicians